Thomas Fletcher (third ¼ 1874 – 28 August 1950) was an English rugby union and professional rugby league footballer who played in the 1890s and 1900s. Prior to the 1898–99 season, Seaton was a rugby union club.

Background
Tom Fletcher's birth was registered in Seaton, Cumberland, England, and he died aged 75 in Cockermouth, Cumberland, England.

Playing career

International honours
Tom Fletcher won a cap for England (RU) while at Seaton in 1897 against Wales.

County honours
Tom Fletcher won caps for Cumberland (RL) while at Seaton (or Oldham) in 1898 against Cheshire and Lancashire.

Change of Code
When Seaton converted from the rugby union code to the rugby league code for the 1898–99 season, Tom Fletcher would have been 24 years of age. Consequently, he was both a rugby union and rugby league footballer for Seaton.

References

External links
 (archived by web.archive.org) Statistics at orl-heritagetrust.org.uk
Search for "Thomas Fletcher" at britishnewspaperarchive.co.uk
Search for "Tom Fletcher" at britishnewspaperarchive.co.uk

1874 births
1950 deaths
Cumberland rugby league team players
England international rugby union players
English rugby league players
English rugby union players
Oldham R.L.F.C. players
Rugby league centres
Rugby league players from Seaton, Cumbria
Rugby union centres
Rugby union players from Seaton, Cumbria